Angela Debatin (born September, 1968) is a Brazilian professional female bodybuilder, ISSA Certified Personal Trainer, and IFA Certified aerobics ad fitness instructor from São Paulo.  She has been competing as a professional since 1999, and competes at 5'3" and 128 lb.

About
Debatin has brown/green eyes and blonde hair. Her off-season weight is 158 pounds and on-season weight is 128 pounds. Her favorite food is Japanese and Italian and her favorite color is blue. 
Debatin's first time in the U.S. was in 1975 when she and her family visited on a vacation. She later moved to the U.S. to compete in professional bodybuilding because Brazil only had amateur classes.

Education
Debatin went to college in Brazil.

Career
Debatin started her career as a powerlifter competitor in 1994. She recorded a 235 lb bench press and a 265 lb squat while only weighing 120 lbs.

Accomplishments
Only Brazilian athlete to have ever qualified to compete at Ms. Olympia for three years in a row. 2001-2003
Invited to Ms. International six years in a row. 2001-2006

Interests
On top of being a professional bodybuilder, Debatin also enjoys motocross and outdoor sports. She is a very skilled hunter, skeet shooter, and Sporting Clays competitor in Central Florida.

Organizations
Debatin is a member of numerous organizations which include:
National Rifle Association
United States Practical Shooting Association
Ducks Unlimited
National Sporting Clays Association

Contest history 

1995 Novices - runner-up
1996 São Paulo State Championship - 1st
1996 Brazilian Championship - runner-up
1997 State-Selective Championship - 1st
1997 São Paulo State Championship - 1st
1997 Brazilian Championship - 1st (MW)
1997 Ibero-Americano Championship (Rio de Janeiro) - runner-up
1998 Ibero-Americano Championship (Guatemala) - 3rd
1998 IFBB World Amateur - 13th (MW)
1999 Pro World Championship - 9th
1999 Jan Tana Classic - 15th
2000 Ms. International - 7th (LW)
2000 Jan Tana Classic - 4th (LW)
2001 Ms. International - 3rd (LW)
2001 IFBB Ms. Olympia - 9th (LW)
2002 Ms. International - 5th (LW)
2002 Southwest USA Pro Cup - 1st (MW)
2002 IFBB Ms. Olympia - 5th (LW)
2003 Ms. International - 8th (LW)
2003 Night of Champions - 5th (LW)
2003 Jan Tana Classic - 1st (LW)
2003 IFBB Ms. Olympia - 5th (LW)
2004 GNC Show of Strength - 8th (LW)
2004 Night of Champions - 7th (LW)
2004 Ms. International - 5th (LW)
2004 Southwest USA Pro Cup - 3rd (LW)
2005 Ms. International - 5th (LW)
2005 Charlotte Pro Championships - 4th (LW)
2005 Europa Supershow - 4th (LW)
2006 Ms. International - 14th
2006 Europa Supershow - 10th
2007 Sacramento Pro - 5th (LW)
2007 Atlantic City Pro - 3rd (LW)
2013 Ms. International - 6th
2014 Wings of Strength PBW Tampa Pro - 16th
2015 Wings of Strength PBW Tampa Pro - 10th

References

External links
Official web site

1968 births
Living people
Brazilian expatriate sportspeople in the United States
Brazilian female bodybuilders
Professional bodybuilders
Sportspeople from São Paulo